There are over 9,000 Grade I listed buildings in England. This page is a list of these buildings in the district of West Oxfordshire in Oxfordshire.

List of buildings

|}

See also
 Grade II* listed buildings in West Oxfordshire
 Grade I listed buildings in Oxfordshire
 Grade I listed buildings in Cherwell (district)
 Grade I listed buildings in Oxford
 Grade I listed buildings in South Oxfordshire
 Grade I listed buildings in Vale of White Horse

Notes

External links

West Oxfordshire
West Oxfordshire
West Oxfordshire District